The 2022 Sport Clips Haircuts VFW Help a Hero 200 was the 24th stock car race of the 2022 NASCAR Xfinity Series, and the 30th iteration of the event. The race was held on Saturday, September 3, 2022, in Darlington, South Carolina at Darlington Raceway, a  permanent tri-oval shaped racetrack. The race took the scheduled 147 laps to complete. In an exciting battle for the finish, Noah Gragson, driving for JR Motorsports, took advantage of the lead on the last lap, and earned his ninth career NASCAR Xfinity Series win, along with his fourth of the season. To fill out the podium, Sheldon Creed, driving for Richard Childress Racing, and A. J. Allmendinger, driving for Kaulig Racing, finished 2nd and 3rd, respectively.

On the final lap of the race, Sheldon Creed and Kyle Larson were side by side, battling for the win. Creed and Larson made big contact coming through turns one and two. Noah Gragson went to the inside lane through the straightaway, causing it to be three wide. Creed would eventually get loose, causing him to hit the outside wall. He continued to ride the wall through turns three and four, trying to stay in front of the leader, Gragson. It would be unsuccessful, and Gragson was able to steal the win. Creed ultimately finished 2nd, and Larson fell back to finish 5th. Gragson dominated the race in general, leading 82 laps.

Background 
Darlington Raceway is a race track built for NASCAR racing located in Darlington, South Carolina. It is nicknamed "The Lady in Black" and "The Track Too Tough to Tame" by many NASCAR fans and drivers and advertised as "A NASCAR Tradition." It is of a unique, somewhat egg-shaped design, an oval with the ends of very different configurations, a condition which supposedly arose from the proximity of one end of the track to a minnow pond the owner refused to relocate. This situation makes it very challenging for the crews to set up their cars' handling in a way that will be effective at both ends.

Entry list 

 (R) denotes rookie driver.
 (i) denotes driver who are ineligible for series driver points.

Practice 
The only 30-minute practice session was held on Saturday, September 3, at 10:00 AM EST.

Qualifying 
Qualifying was held on Saturday, September 3, at 10:30 AM EST. Since Darlington Raceway is a tri-oval track, the qualifying system used is a single-car, single-lap system with only one round. Whoever sets the fastest time in the round wins the pole.

Race results 
Stage 1 Laps: 45

Stage 2 Laps: 45

Stage 3 Laps: 57

Standings after the race 

Drivers' Championship standings

Note: Only the first 12 positions are included for the driver standings.

References 

2022 NASCAR Xfinity Series
NASCAR races at Daytona International Speedway
Sport Clips Haircuts VFW 200
2022 in sports in South Carolina